Ramphocaenus is a genus of passerine bird from South America.

Species
Ramphocaenus contains the following species:
 Chattering gnatwren (Ramphocaenus sticturus)
Trilling gnatwren (Ramphocaenus melanurus)

References

 
Bird genera
Taxa named by Louis Jean Pierre Vieillot